Strehaia is a town in Mehedinți County, Oltenia, Romania. It is situated on the Motru River valley, in the eastern part of the county. Forests in the vicinity are home to the largest Hermann's tortoise colonies in Oltenia.

Nine villages are administered by the town: Ciochiuța, Comanda, Hurducești, Lunca Banului, Menți, Motruleni, Slătinicu Mare, Slătinicu Mic, and Stăncești.

Demographics
At the 2011 census, the town had a population of 9,837. Of these, 88.79% were Romanians and 11.11% Roma; 99.4% were Romanian Orthodox.

History

Strehaia was first mentioned in documents of the 15th century. As an alternative location for the residence of Oltenian Bans during the early Craiovești rules, the town still features the foundation of the Banate estate house; it had replaced Severin due to frequent Ottoman attacks, and was in turn replaced by Craiova, remaining a largely rural locality.

The Monastery of Strehaia was built by Wallachian Prince Matei Basarab in 1645. In 1671, a cattle fair was organized in the town, a regular event which contributed to the town's development. Strehaia was the site of skirmishes between the Pandurs of Tudor Vladimirescu and troops loyal to Scarlat Callimachi, during the Wallachian uprising of 1821.

The estates of Prince Antoine Bibesco were located near Strehaia.

Natives 
 Rodion Cămătaru (born 1958), footballer
 Nicolae Popescu (1937–2010), mathematician

References

Towns in Romania
Populated places in Mehedinți County
Localities in Oltenia